Yelian He ( | Mandarin: hé yè lián) is an Australian/Chinese classical concert cellist and martial arts teacher. Born in Shanghai and raised in Melbourne, Yelian began studying the Cello at the age of 5, almost two years after he commenced studies on the Piano with his father. Hailed as a “consummate master of the bow” by The Strad magazine in his Wigmore Hall debut, He is the winner of the 2009 Royal Over-Seas League String Competition in London as well as the Grand Prize and Audience Prize at the 2014 Australian Cello Awards competition in Sydney.

Early life
Yelian He was born in Shanghai, China. He emigrated to Australia in 1992 with his family where he furthered his studies at Scotch College, Melbourne. Yelian graduated with a B.Mus from University of Melbourne Faculty of VCA and MCM on an Otti Veit Scholarship, and subsequently relocated to Manchester to study with Karine Georgian at the Royal Northern College of Music where he graduated with a master's degree in Music.

Career
In 2009, Yelian won the string section in the Royal Over-Seas League 57th Annual Music Competition, and was the Grand Prize winner in the 2014 Australian Cello Awards, winning a host of awards in Sydney's Verbrugghen Hall. Yelian has given recitals and performances at Wigmore Hall, Queen Elizabeth Hall, St John's, Smith Square, Bridgewater Hall, Melbourne Recital Centre, Sydney Opera House, City Recital Hall, Hamer Hall, Perth Concert Hall, Shanghai Concert Hall, Shanghai Grand Theatre, Oriental Arts Centre, Forbidden City Concert Hall, Wuxi Grand Theatre, Wuhan QinTai Concert Hall. He has appeared as a soloist with orchestras such as the Sydney Symphony Orchestra, West Australian Symphony Orchestra, and Shanghai Philharmonic Orchestra.

Yelian's first CD - Y2: Music for Cello & Piano, was released by Willowhayne Records (UK) and featured the works of Svante Henryson and Nikolai Kapustin among other works. The release was praised by the composer Henryson, who has stated "Yelian He plays On A Day Like This and Black Run with all the passion, energy and technical mastery that I as a composer could wish for. It is a joy to hear his versions."

Yelian regularly gives masterclasses in UK, Asia, Australia and New Zealand.

Awards

Tait Memorial Trust Award (2007, 2009)
Australian Music Foundation Award (2009)
Tunnell Trust Award (2012)
 Kirckman Concert Society Award (2013)
 City Music Foundation Artist (2014)

In 2011, Yelian was presented to HM Queen Elizabeth II at a reception for outstanding Australians in the United Kingdom, and again in 2013 in a private performance for the Queen and her Commonwealth guests at Buckingham Palace.

Personal life
Yelian's nickname is the “Kung Fu Cellist” and studies Wing Chun Kung Fu with his Sifu in Manchester. He is a part of the Tse Qigong Centre under Grandmaster Ip Chun's lineage (eldest son of the legendary Ip Man, most popularly known from Ip Man (film series) and teacher of Bruce Lee). Since 2019 Yelian started his own Wing Chun classes in Melbourne, where he resides.

References

Sources
Yelian He official website
 Hancock Artists official website

1984 births
Living people
Australian classical cellists
Chinese classical cellists
University of Melbourne alumni
Musicians from Melbourne
Musicians from Shanghai
Academics of the Royal Northern College of Music